Wolfgang Edgar Nolting (born 6 April 1948 in Wilhelmshaven) is a retired German Vizeadmiral and former Inspector of the Navy from 2006 until 2010.

References

External links 

1948 births
Vice admirals of the German Navy
Living people
Chiefs of Navy (Germany)